Seven (stylized as Se7en) is a 1995 American crime thriller film directed by David Fincher and written by Andrew Kevin Walker. It stars Brad Pitt, Morgan Freeman, Gwyneth Paltrow, and John C. McGinley. Set in a crime-ridden, unnamed city, Sevens plot follows disenchanted, near-retirement detective William Somerset (Freeman) and his new partner, the recently transferred David Mills (Pitt), as they attempt to stop a serial killer before he can complete a series of murders based on the seven deadly sins.

Walker, an aspiring writer, wrote Seven based on his experiences of moving from a suburban setting to New York City in the late 1980s, during a period of rising crime and drug addiction. His script was optioned by an Italian film company which underwent financial difficulties and sold the rights on to New Line Cinema. Executives were opposed to the script's bleak ending and mandated a more mainstream, upbeat outcome. Eager to prove himself after the failure of his first feature film project, Alien 3, Fincher read Walker's original script which he was sent by mistake and agreed to direct as long as the ending remained. The studio continued its efforts to change the ending, but faced opposition from Fincher and the cast. On a $33–$34million budget, principal photography took place mainly on location in Los Angeles. Rob Bottin helmed the special effects team responsible for realizing the elaborate murders, using makeup and prosthetics.

Seven received middling test audience results and was not expected to perform well due to its violent and mature content, but it went on to earn $327.3 million worldwide, becoming a surprise success and one of the highest-performing films of the year. Reviews at the time were more mixed, with critics praising Freeman's performance, but criticizing the dark cinematography, implicit and implied violence, and the bleak ending. Seven revitalized Fincher's career and helped Pitt transition from roles based on his appearance to more serious, dramatic roles.

In the years since, consensus on the movie has shifted, and Seven is now regarded as one of the best thriller, crime, and mystery films ever made. It remains influential in filmmaking, inspiring a host of imitators of its aesthetic, style, and premise of detectives chasing down serial killers with distinctive methods and motives. The film's title sequence, depicting the killer preparing for his actions later in the film, is considered an important design innovation and also influential on future credit sequences, while Sevens twist ending has been named as one of the best in cinematic history.

Plot 
In a city overcome with violent crime and corruption, disillusioned police detective, William Somerset, is one week from retirement. He is partnered with David Mills, a short-tempered but idealistic detective who recently relocated to the city with his wife, Tracy. On Monday, Somerset and Mills investigate an obese man forced to eat until his stomach burst, killing him, and uncover the word "gluttony" written on the wall. Somerset fails to get himself and Mills reassigned to another case, believing it is too extreme for his last investigation. The following day, the second victim, greed, is found, having been forced to cut a pound of flesh from his body. Clues at the scene lead Somerset and Mills to the sloth victim, a drug-dealing pederast, who they find emaciated and restrained to a bed. Photographs reveal the victim was restrained for exactly one year. Somerset surmises that the murders are based on the seven deadly sins.

Tracy invites Somerset to share supper with her and Mills, helping the detectives overcome their mutual hostility toward each other. On Friday, Tracy meets privately with Somerset as she has no other acquaintances in the city. She reveals her unhappiness at moving there, especially after learning she is pregnant, and believes the city is an unfit place to raise a child. Somerset sympathises with Tracy, having convinced his former girlfriend to abort their child for similar reasons and regretting it ever since; he advises her to inform Mills only if she intends to keep the child.

A comment by Mills inspires Somerset to research libraries for anyone checking-out books based on the seven deadly sins, leading the pair to the apartment of John Doe. The suspect returns home unexpectedly and is pursued by Mills, who is incapacitated after being struck with a tire iron by Doe. Mills is held at gunpoint momentarily, but Doe chooses to flee. The police investigate Doe's apartment, finding a large amount of cash, hundreds of notebooks revealing Doe's psychopathy, and photos of some of his victims, including images taken of Somerset and Mills by what they believed was an intrusive journalist at the Sloth crime scene. Doe calls the apartment and speaks of his admiration for Mills.

On Saturday, Somerset and Mills investigate the fourth victim, lust, a prostitute raped with a custom-made, bladed strap-on by a man held at gunpoint. The pride victim is found the following day, a model who took her own life rather than live without her beauty, after being facially disfigured by Doe. As Somerset and Mills return to the police station, Doe arrives and turns himself in. He threatens to plead insanity at his trial, potentially escaping punishment, unless Mills and Somerset escort him to an undisclosed location where they will find the envy and wrath victims. During the drive there, Doe explains that he believes himself to be chosen by God to send a message about the ubiquity of and apathy toward sin. Doe has no remorse for his victims, believing the shocking murders will force society to pay attention to him.

Doe leads the detectives to a remote location, where a delivery van approaches. Somerset intercepts the vehicle and opens a package the driver was instructed to deliver to Mills at this specific time. Horrified at what he finds inside, Somerset tells Mills to put his gun down. Doe reveals that he himself represents envy because he envied Mills' life with Tracy, and implies the package contains her severed head. He urges Mills to become wrath, telling him that Tracy begged for her life and that of her unborn child, and takes pleasure in realizing that Mills was unaware of the pregnancy. Despite Somerset's pleas, the distraught and enraged Mills shoots Doe to death, completing his plan. As the catatonic Mills is taken away by the police, Somerset tells his captain that he will "be around." A narration by Somerset says: "Ernest Hemingway once wrote 'The world is a fine place and worth fighting for.' I agree with the second part."

Cast 

 Brad Pitt as David Mills: A well-meaning but impulsive homicide detective
 Morgan Freeman as William Somerset: A veteran police officer disillusioned with his job
 Gwyneth Paltrow as Tracy Mills: Detective Mills' pregnant wife
 R. Lee Ermey as Police Captain: The detectives' grizzled superior
 John C. McGinley as California: A SWAT team leader
 Kevin Spacey as John Doe: A serial killer inspired by the seven deadly sins
 Richard Roundtree as Martin Talbot: The district attorney

Seven also features Julie Araskog as Mrs. Gould, John Cassini as Officer Davis, Reg E. Cathey, Peter Crombie, and Richard Portnow as, respectively, Doctors Santiago, O'Neill, and Beardsley, Richard Schiff as Mark Swarr, and Mark Boone Junior as "greasy FBI Man." Hawthorne James appears as George, the library night guard, Michael Massee portrays "man in massage parlour booth", Leland Orser plays "crazed man in massage parlour", Pamala Tyson portrays a thin vagrant outside Doe's apartment, and Doe's delivery man is played by Richmond Arquette.

Doe's victims include: Bob Mack appears as Gluttony, a morbidly obese man force fed until his stomach bursts; Gene Borkan portrays Greed, a criminal-attorney forced to cut off his own flesh; and Michael Reid MacKay appears as the Sloth victim, Theodore "Victor" Allen, a drug dealer and child abuser. Cat Mueller portrays the Lust victim, a sex worker impaled with a bladed sex toy, and Heidi Schanz appears as model Rachel Slade, Pride, who is disfigured by Doe. Writer Andrew Kevin Walker makes a cameo appearance as a corpse investigated by Somerset during the film's opening scene, Freeman's son, Alfonso, appears as a fingerprint technician, and columnist George Christy portrays the police department janitor scraping Somerset's name from his door.

Production

Writing 
Andrew Kevin Walker, moved from the suburbs of Pennsylvania to New York City in 1986, and described the "culture shock" of living in a city undergoing a period of significant rises in crime and drug abuse. While working as a sales assistant for Tower Records in 1991, the aspiring screenwriter began writing a spec script, Seven, set in a bleak and gloomy (unnamed) city inspired by his "depressing" time in New York. Walker said, "it's true that if I hadn't lived there I probably wouldn't have written Seven... I think it's that way for anything—the right time and the right mood, and the right inspiration, whatever inspiration is. That's what's so scary about writing." Film studios were eager for high concept spec scripts, and Walker believed his thriller about police officers pursuing a serial killer driven by the seven deadly sins would attract attention and help begin a professional writing career.

Walker intended to leave the narrative open to interpretation so as to not invalidate the opinions of his prospective audience. He wanted to defy the audiences' expectations and leave them feeling "violated and exhausted" by the conclusion, because "there's lots of evil out there, and you're not always going to get the satisfaction of having any sort of understanding of why that is. That's one of the things that scares people the most about serial killers." For the killer, Walker recounted his own experiences of walking down the city streets and observing crimes and sins being openly committed on every corner, and what would happen if someone was specifically focused on these sins. He had Doe surrender himself to the police because it would rob the audience and characters of the anticipated satisfaction and make them uncomfortable leading into the finale.

The script was optioned in the early 1990s by Italian company, Penta Film, under manager Phyllis Carlyle. Walker was paid the minimum fee allowed by the Writers Guild of America, which he described as not being "fuck you money," but enough to quit his job, relocate to Los Angeles, and work on Seven.

Development
 
To helm the project, Penta Film hired director Jeremiah S. Chechik, who had recently directed the successful comedy film, National Lampoon's Christmas Vacation (1989), and was looking for a more serious project. However, Chechik and Penta Film mandated several script changes, including removing the bleak "head-in-the-box" ending, in which the decapitated head of Tracy is delivered in a box. Given the option to refuse the requests and risk being replaced or the project cancelled, Walker acquiesced, writing a more mainstream ending in which the detectives confront Doe in a church, described as either burnt-out or actively on fire. In this version, Doe embodies the sin of Envy and kills Mills before being shot dead by Somerset, while a pregnant Tracy leaves the city. In a 2017 interview, Walker said he felt that he was ruining his script and should have left the project. In total, he wrote thirteen different drafts to meet the studio demands. The project failed to progress and as the option was expiring and Penta Film was experiencing financial difficulties (eventually dissolving in 1994), the studio sold the rights to producer Arnold Kopelson, who brought it to film studio, New Line Cinema. Chechik also left the project, with Guillermo del Toro and Phil Joanou approached to replace him; Joanou turned it down because he found the story too bleak.

David Fincher was mainly known for directing popular music videos, such as "Janie's Got a Gun", "Vogue", and "Who Is It". His only feature film, Alien 3 (1992), had been a negative experience which tasked him with filming without a complete script, and its studio, 20th Century Fox, significantly modified the film in editing, against Fincher's wishes. Fincher disowned the film, saying "I'd rather die of colon cancer than make another movie." Even so, his agent brought him the Seven script. Fincher was uninterested in the police procedural aspects but found himself drawn in by the gradual reveal of Doe's plans, saying "I found myself getting more and more trapped in this kind of evil... and even though I felt uncomfortable about being there, I had to keep going." He determined the script matched his own creative sensibilities, particularly its "meditation on evil and how evil gets on you and you can't get it off," and uncompromising ending in which "[Tracy's] been dead for hours and there's no bullshit chase across town and the guy driving on sidewalks to get to the woman, who's drawing a bath while the serial killer sneaks in the back window." Fincher expressed his interest to the studio, and it was realized that he had been sent Walker's original script. New Line Cinema sent Fincher a current draft in which Tracy survived, but he would only agree to direct the original script. He met with New Line Cinema's president of production, Michael De Luca, who also preferred the original script and the pair agreed to start filming that version in six weeks, believing delaying any longer risked executives noticing their plan and interfering.

Despite their efforts, Kopelson and studio executives made efforts to lighten Sevens tone and change the ending. Fincher was resistant to any changes, unwilling to compromise his creative control or vision. De Luca remained supportive of Fincher, and the original ending gained further backing as the project secured prominent actors, including Freeman, Pitt, and Spacey. In particular, Pitt said he joined Seven on condition that the head-in-the-box ending be retained, and that Mills "[shoots] the killer in the end. He doesn't do the 'right' thing, he does the thing of passion." He was upset that the original ending to his previous film, Legends of the Fall (1994), had been cut in response to negative test audience results. Kopelson was convinced to support Fincher after being reassured that the decapitated head would not be shown, saying "it needed this horrendous event to kick off the last sin, wrath," that would be discussed for decades. Walker said, "there's nothing wrong with [positive] endings, it's just that the dark ending of Seven was what it was about. To change the ending to something else was to remove the very heart of the story.

Walker performed some script refinements, including extending a chase sequence depicting Mills cautiously pursuing Doe, aiming to avoid typical cinematic chases in which characters frantically pursued their target. He said, "I always thought, 'God, if someone was shooting at me, I would be terrified to turn any corner!'" A shooting script was completed by August 1994.

Casting

Pitt had established himself as a credible film star following successes with Interview with the Vampire (1994) and Legends of the Fall, but Fincher had not considered him to portray Mills because "I'd never seen Mills as particularly accomplished, and I was concerned that [Pitt] seemed too together. But when I met him, I thought, this guy is so likable he can get away with murder—he can do anything and people will forgive him for it." Conscious of Pitt's popularity and importance to Sevens potential success, Kopelson shortened the pre-production schedule to five weeks from twelve to fit his schedule. Pitt turned down several offers from other films because he wanted to escape his typecasting as a romantic lead character in favor of something with a more "documentary feel" with urban settings and a focus on dialogue, akin to thriller films such as The Conversation (1974). He said, "I just wanted to escape the cheese... I came to find out [Fincher] had a lactose intolerance as well, so I was very happy about it." Pitt described Mills as a well-intentioned "idiot" who "speaks before he really knows what he's talking about." He cut his hair for the role and lost weight to reduce the muscle he developed for Legends of the Fall. Sylvester Stallone and Denzel Washington turned the role down.

Walker named the Somerset character after writer W. Somerset Maugham. Walker envisioned William Hurt playing the character, but Fincher cast Freeman; the studio was concerned that pairing a black and white detective would make Seven seem derivative of the action film Lethal Weapon (1987). Robert Duvall, Gene Hackman, and Al Pacino turned the role down. The script was modified further after Pitt's and Freeman's castings to better match their acting styles; Mills was made more verbose, and Somerset's dialogue was trimmed down, being made more precise and direct. Robin Wright auditioned for, and Christina Applegate turned down the role of Tracy before Paltrow was cast. She was recommended by Pitt who had been impressed by her Legends of the Fall audition. Fincher also preferred Paltrow, but was told by those involved that she would not be interested in a "dark" film like Seven. He auditioned about 100 people before Pitt contacted her directly to meet with them. Fincher said Tracy is "so important because it's the only sunshine we have in the film. This is the feel-bad movie of [1995]... we needed someone who could take those little seconds she gets and fill them with soul, and that's what I'd always seen in her performances."

Fincher and Walker wanted Ned Beatty to play John Doe, because of his resemblance to the 1969 composite sketch of the Zodiac Killer; Beatty declined, describing the script as the "most evil thing I've ever read." Michael Stipe, lead vocalist of the rock band R.E.M., was considered but the filming dates conflicted with the band's tour, Val Kilmer declined the role, and R. Lee Ermey auditioned, but Fincher said his portrayal was "completely unsympathetic" without any depth. Kevin Spacey was preferred by Pitt, but executives refused to pay his salary. Doe's scenes were initially filmed with an unknown actor portraying Doe, but the filmmakers quickly decided to replace them and Pitt helped negotiate Spacey's involvement. Spacey recalled, "I got a call on a Friday night, and on Monday morning I was on a plane to Los Angeles, shooting on Tuesday"; he filmed his scenes in twelve days. Spacey wanted his name omitted from the film's marketing and opening credits to ensure the killer's identity remained a secret. He said, "I'd just done Swimming With Sharks (1994), The Usual Suspects, and Outbreak (both 1995)... I knew that if any of those movies did well, my profile would be... different. How would that affect my billing in Se7en? If I'm the third-billed actor in a movie where the top two billings are trying to find somebody and they don't find that somebody until the last reel, then it's obvious who that somebody is. It was a bit of a shit-fight for a couple of days, but I felt very strongly that it was the right thing to do for the movie. We finally won because it was a deal-breaker; I was either going to be on a plane to shoot the movie or I wasn't."

The  Bob Mack made his theatrical debut as Gluttony, described as a "very heavy guy face down in spaghetti." Gene Borkan was cast to play the Greed victim because the filmmakers wanted someone who resembled lawyer Robert Shapiro. He did not realize his character would already be dead and refused a request to perform nude, telling Fincher "I'll be naked if you're naked. Otherwise, you don't get that." On the set, when he realized what his scene entailed, Borkan renegotiated his salary, receiving "five times [the $522 Screen Actors Guild day-scale fee]." Michael Reid Mackay's (Sloth) audition involved him portraying a corpse who slowly turned his head towards the camera; it was deemed "creepy" enough. Set decorator, Cat Mueller, portrayed the Lust victim after Fincher's assistant said she had the personality and body to portray a "dead hooker." She received $500 for six hours of filming over two days, but described being nude in front of Pitt as a perk. Model, Heidi Schanz, was cast as the Pride victim after the previous actress dropped out. Running low on time, Fincher wanted a model with existing headshots and pictures that could be displayed in the character's apartment. She said, "even though I'm dead, I think it's the most glamorized murder." The film's content made casting and crewing Seven difficult; Gary Oldman turned down an unspecified role, Fincher's former costume designer declined to work on the film, and talent agents refused to pass offers on to their clients, describing Seven as "evil and misogynistic."

Filming 

Principal photography began on December 12, 1994, and concluded on March 10, 1995. Assistant director, Michael Alan Kahn, recalled the commencement of filming: "I went up to Fincher and I said, 'Look at this! Look! It's here! We're here! You did it! We're shooting a movie... isn't this amazing?...' And he looked at me as though I were from outer space and said, 'No, it's awful... now I have to get what's in my head out of all you cretins.'" Walker was on set throughout filming to provide suggestions or on-spec rewrites, but did not give Fincher much input, believing he should adapt the script as he wanted.

Location shooting took place entirely in downtown Los Angeles. Fincher wanted to shoot in Oakland, California, because it had "beautiful clapboard houses," but the schedule would not allow for this. The film's near constant rain was a pragmatic decision, as Pitt was only available for a total of fifty-five days before he began filming 12 Monkeys (1995), and it often rained during filming so to avoid any continuity errors Fincher decided to have near-constant rain. He also believed it introduced an inescapable element for the characters, because conditions were bad inside and outside, and made it appear less like Los Angeles which was associated with sunny weather.

Sevens aesthetic was influenced by films such as All That Jazz (1979), The Silence of the Lambs (1991), and The French Connection (1971), as well as the "vulnerable" over-the-shoulder viewpoint of documentary television show, Cops. Cinematographer Darius Khondji also named the crime thriller, Klute (1971), as a significant influence because of its "use of toplight... widescreen compositions for intimacy rather than big vistas, the way that vertical strips of the city are shown in horizontal mode, the fragments of faces and bodies... the look of Se7en has this heightened sense of realism—a realism that's been kicked up several notches and becomes its own style." Fincher singled out one scene in Klute, in which the only illumination is the character's flashlight, saying he disliked other films where characters state that visibility is low but the audience can see the scene clearly. Khondji used a mixture of lighting, such as the warm light of Chinese lanterns to represent the past and present, and the cold light of Kino Flos to represent the future.

The studio was unhappy with how dark the dailies were; Khondji suggested printing the footage brighter, but Fincher refused to compromise. Available footage was made into a well-received promotional showreel for the theater owner convention, ShoWest, after which complaints about the darkness ceased. Khondji used Panavision Primo lenses which offered a sharp image with good contrast, and Kodak film stocks which could capture the "gritty" interiors and deep blacks for night-time exteriors.

The scene in which Mills pursues Doe was described by Khondji, as one of the most difficult scenes to film due to its length as well as fast camera movements in the rain or tight interior spaces that were barely lit. One segment had to be re-filmed because the location was too dark for the camera to capture Freeman's face. Pitt also insisted on performing his own stunts for the scene, and slipped on a rain-slicked car bonnet, crashing through the windshield and sustaining injuries including cut tendons and nerves in his left hand; Fincher said he saw exposed bone. He returned to the set a few days later, having received stitches and a forearm cast which had to be written into later scenes. For scenes set prior to the chase, Pitt would keep his hand in his pocket or otherwise obscured to hide the injury. Pitt said he regretted not disrobing for a separate scene of Mills and Somerset shaving their chests to wear concealed listening devices. He disliked the public attention given to his body, but later came to believe that taking his shirt off would have conveyed the growing partnership between Mills and Somerset.

The crew had to clear used condoms and crack pipes from the location of the Sloth victim sequence, replacing those with prop crack pipes and air fresheners. The actors were not told the Sloth victim was a person in costume, and McGinley's shock at the body moving was real. Lights with green color gels were shone through the window from the adjacent building to give everything a green tint. Leland Orser, who portrays the man forced to kill the Lust victim, deprived himself of sleep to achieve a "deranged mindset"; his scene was pushed back so he stayed awake another night. He would breathe rapidly between scenes to make himself hyperventilate on camera. The ending was scripted to take place directly beneath transmission towers, a location picked by Doe to interfere with the police communications, but it actually interfered with the film crew radios, and the actors had to use cell phones to communicate with the crew from afar.

Ending and post-production 
The ending remained a point of contention between New Line Cinema and the filmmakers. Fincher wanted to follow Mills shooting Doe with a sudden cut to black, intending to leave the audience stunned, but executives believed this would alienate audiences. Fincher instructed staff at a test screening to keep the lights off following the cut to black so the audience could take it in; his instructions were not followed. Afterward, one female audience member walking by Fincher said, "the people who made that movie should be killed." Fincher said the screening invitation said, "Would you like to see a new movie starring Brad Pitt and Morgan Freeman," both known for films very different in tone to Seven, "I don't know what the fuck they thought they were gonna see... but I'm telling you, from the reaction of the people in there, they were bristling. They couldn't have been more offended." Executives wanted a mainstream conclusion in which Mills and Somerset pursue Doe and a kidnapped Tracy, who would survive. Pitt recalled, "[the studio says] 'You know, he would be much more heroic if he didn’t shoot John Doe—and it's too unsettling with the head in the box. We think maybe if it was [Mills'] dog's head in the box.'" Freeman preferred a storyboarded sequence of Somerset killing Doe, sparing Mills from losing his career as well, but Pitt believed Mills had to kill Doe and test audiences preferred that version. Another alternative depicted Mills shooting Somerset to stop him killing Doe before he could. Fincher and Pitt refused to compromise on the head-in-the-box ending but settled for a longer epilogue showing Mills being arrested and Somerset delivering a concluding narration offering some optimism.

Pitt and Fincher were unhappy with the car ride scene leading into the ending because the dialogue had to be dubbed over as too much ambient sound had been picked up during filming. Pitt believed this caused the scene to "lose its breath," affecting the pacing and emotion. The helicopter scenes were also filmed in post-production as there was no time during principal photography, but the studio agreed extra time and funding if the scenes were deemed necessary. Filmed several months later, the green ground had turned brown and so the ground-based scenes had to be color corrected to match the new footage. The opening credits were scripted to be set over footage of Somerset visiting a countryside home he intended to purchase for his retirement, taking a piece of the wallpaper that he would carry through the film, before returning to the city by train. This was intended to create a stark contrast between the countryside and the darkness of the city, but there was insufficient budget to film it. Scenes of Somerset looking at the wallpaper piece had to be cut as a result.

Richard Francis-Bruce edited the 127minute theatrical cut. His style focused on "having a motivated cut," believing every cut needed to be done with a specific purpose. For the finale, he introduced more rapid cuts to emphasize the tension as Doe's plan is revealed, and a brief four frame insert of Tracy as Mills pulls the trigger, to compensate for not showing the contents of the box. To emphasize the darkness, Fincher and Khondji used an expensive and lengthy bleach bypass chemical process which retained more of the silver present in the filmstock which would normally be lost. The silver created a luminous effect in lighter tones and deeper darker colors. Of the 2,500 prints sent to theaters, only a few hundred used the process.

Seven was budgeted at $30–$31million, but Fincher convinced studio executives to provide further funding to achieve his vision for the film, eventually pushing it $3million over budget, to a total of $33–$34million, making it New Line Cinema's most expensive film at that point. A studio employee said studio executives "would go into these meetings with [Fincher], saying, 'Absolutely not, not a penny more'... but he was so relentless and persuasive that they'd come out all ga-ga-eyed, and give him more money." About $15million of the budget was spent on below-the-line costs.

Music and sound
Fincher hired Howard Shore to score Seven, based on his score for The Silence of the Lambs. Shore said Fincher would attend recording sessions but rarely interfered with Shore's process. Performed by an orchestra of up to 100 musicians, the score combines elements of brass, percussion, piano, and trumpets. "Portrait of John Doe" serves as the central theme with two cue notes; a rising version is used for Tracy's appearances. Shore described the film's ending as having a "visceral, kind of primal effect on me." He incorporated his reaction into the sequence's score, providing little accompaniment during the dialogue between Mills, Somerset, and Doe, but using it to punctuate significant moments such as Somerset opening the box. Shore said "the music starts, and it turns the scene, it turns it into John Doe's perspective... the music enters, and you realize, the look of the horror on his face, it's a chilling moment."

Shore's opening theme, "The Last Seven Days", described as a more "upbeat" piece, was replaced by a remix of industrial rock band Nine Inch Nails's "Closer" by Coil and Danny Hyde. David Bowie's "The Hearts Filthy Lesson" is used for the end credits. Seven features songs including: "In the Beginning" by The Statler Brothers, "Guilty" by Gravity Kills, "Trouble Man" by Marvin Gaye, "Speaking of Happiness" by Gloria Lynne, "Suite No. 3 in D Major, BWV 1068 Air" by Stuttgarter Kammerorchester and Karl Münchinger, "Love Plus One" by Haircut One Hundred, "I Cover the Waterfront" by Billie Holiday, "Now's the Time" by Charlie Parker, and "Straight, No Chaser" by Thelonious Monk.

Fincher hired his friend Ren Klyce as sound designer. They inserted sounds on the outside of each frame, such as raining or screaming, to create a psychological impression that terrifying things are occurring even when the audience cannot see or escape it. Klyce and sound designer Steve Boedekker also produced the music heard at the entrance to the Lust murder sex club.

Design

Style and set design
Fincher, Khondji, production designer Arthur Max, and costume designer Michael Kaplan, collaborated on establishing a unified vision for the art direction. Fincher established the design rules for the film: "This is a world that's fucked up and nothing works." He wanted every design aspect to look neglected and in a state of decay. Fincher was influenced by the photography of William Eggleston, focused on "coolness", making the visuals simultaneously gritty and stylized as well as classic and contemporary, and the black-and-white photographs of Robert Frank. Khondji said Frank's style could be seen in Sevens very bright exteriors and dark interiors. Many interior scenes were underexposed to create a stark contrast, which in turn made the exteriors stand out more. Interior lighting was also often provided by external sources, using only a few interior artificial lights. The end scene with Mills, Somserset, and Doe, featured inconsistent lighting because the actors were always lit from behind by the sun regardless of where they were standing in the scene, which Khondji described as "a bit of a nightmare and never realistic in terms of continuity."

Fincher wanted precise staging for every scene to make the audience feel as if they were in the location. He had sets built without removable walls so that they had to film within the confined of the sets, believing it was important to create limitations to challenge himself. Doe's murder scenes were influenced by photography, such as the work of Joel-Peter Witkin. The "gluttony" set was wrapped in plastic to contain the cockroaches and a cockroach wrangler was used to help control them. The Sloth scene, in particular, took influence from the work of painter Edvard Munch, drawing on the green and "claustrophobic" imagery. The "Lust" sex club ceilings were lowered to make the space more claustrophobic and was sprayed on the walls for texture and to imply that they were covered in bodily fluids. A former bank was used as the library and 5,000 books were rented to fill the space, supplemented with fiberglass replicas. The shaking in Mills apartment, caused by a passing train, was created using gas-powered engines attached to the set. Walker's script described Doe's home extensively, with windows painted black for privacy and a drawer filled with empty painkiller bottles to help Doe cope with regular headaches.

Victims
Rob Bottin led development of practical effects. He researched crime scene photos and police evidence files, observed an autopsy, and studied the effects of obesity to realize his designs. For the Gluttony victim, Mack spent up to 10 hours a day having makeup and prosthetics applied. A scuba-like device was used to let Mack breathe while facedown in spaghetti. Mack recalled how he was unaware that he would be surrounded by live insects until reading the daily call sheet and noticing a "cockroach wrangler"; Pitt would flick some roaches off of Mack between takes. The character's autopsy used a fiberglass replica with a deliberately enlarged penis; Fincher said after Mack spent so long in makeup for 30 seconds of screentime, that he could "at least give him a huge cock."

Bottin's team spent eleven days experimenting on the right aesthetic and prosthetics for the Sloth victim portrayed by MacKay. The filmmakers asked him to lose more weight but he declined. The effects team made a body cast of MacKay to develop rubber prosthetics that could be applied all over his body. The appliances were painted to appear bruised and scarred, veins were airbrushed onto MacKay, and he was fitted with gelatin sores, overgrown fingernails, skeletal teeth, and matted hair. The process took up to 14 hours, requiring MacKay to begin at 5am for filming at 8pm. He was brought to the set in costume, and Freeman quipped, "you don't look so good." He described filming the scene as "real heavy-duty," and was left "breathing very hard and crying." He had to remain relatively still over four hours of filming, having to limit his breathing to prevent his stomach rising and falling, and the cold set was worsened by makeup artists repeatedly spraying his body with water. Unable to move, he tensed his muscles to warm himself. He described the moment he was permitted to cough in McGinley's inspecting face as a "great relief," as he could move and breathe again.

For Schanz's Pride victim, Fincher personally added blood to her, while her nose was taped to the side and her face covered in gauze. To secure the film's release, several scenes of Bottin's effects work had to be cut. Fincher described Seven as psychologically violent, implying violence without showing it in action. Walker portrays the opening scene corpse, lying in a pool of blood. He said the blood was very cold, and had a minor panic attack once in place because he was worried about moving and ruining the shot.

Title credits
Following the removal of the planned opening train ride with Somerset, Fincher needed a temporary title sequence to screen Seven for studio executives. He recruited R/GA designer, Kyle Cooper, and his team to assemble a montage slideshow reflecting Doe's perspective. This helped establish the character and his threat earlier in the film as he would not physically appear until Sevens final act. The sequence was set to the "Closer" remix at Fincher's request.

The sequence was well received by executives who suggested retaining it for the theatrical release. Fincher did not want to appear as if he was accepting their suggestion and instructed Cooper to develop a new concept; Cooper convinced Fincher to use a more elaborate and detailed version of his slideshow. Cooper focused on Doe's elaborate journals, glimpsed briefly in the film, while Fincher suggested the sequence physically involve Doe. Fincher wanted Mark Romanek to direct the sequence, being a fan of his music video for "Closer" and sharing similar design sensibilities, but Cooper secured the role because of his previous experience on similar title sequences. Fincher told Cooper, "all I want is for the audience to want to run screaming from the theater during the title section."

The sequence depicts Doe's preparations and routines for his murderous plans, such as cutting off his fingertips, processing photographs in his bathtub, and making tea (inspired by Cooper's appreciation for the "elegant" way Doe stirs his tea following his surrender). As Doe writes in his journals, the sequence focuses on him crossing out words such as "pregnancy," "marriage," and other elements representing concepts of a "perfect life" that he does not believe people deserve. Fincher said, "it was a way of introducing the evil. The idea was that you're watching title sequences from the mind of somebody who's lost it... [the audience] won't understand while they're watching it, but they'll get it later." Doe's journals were made by Clive Piercy and John Sabel, and cost tens of thousands of dollars to fill each one with text and images; about six complete journals were made, supplemented by blank ones on the shelves. Artist Wayne Coe storyboarded the sequence, which was edited by Angus Wall and shot by Harris Savides. Cooper regularly conferred with Wall on ideas, and spent the night before filming locating items that he believed would make interesting inclusions such as fish hooks and loose hairs from his drain.

Filming took place over eight days, including two days filming a hand model stand-in for Doe. Fincher was upset at the casting as the model's hands were shorter and chunkier than Spacey's. A further five weeks were spent putting the sequence together. Although digital options were available, Cooper's team opted to assemble the sequence by hand, believing that any irregularities and accidents in the images incurred would enhance the overall aesthetic, and added manual scratches, tears, and pen marks direct to the film negative. Fincher and Cooper devised a rough-looking text for the credits to appear as if written by a "disturbed hand." Fincher said: "I always liked the idea that the titles would be written by Doe, hand-lettered... [Cooper and I] wanted to have them look personal, not typeset. I liked that it wasn't slick." The text was etched onto a black-surfaced scratchboard and visually manipulated while being transferred to film to add a smear effect combined with different variants of the same text achieved by placing the text over a light box and filming them over-exposed, creating an animation-style effect. "Disquieting" sounds were added throughout the sequence at a low frequency, such as barking dogs and screams. The title sequence cost $50,000.

Release

Context

The theatrical box office of 1994 had achieved record grosses, with nine films earning more than $100million, and the highest attendance (1.29billion) since 1960 (1.3billion). However, by 1995, the average cost of making and marketing a film had doubled since 1990, reaching $50.4million, making it more difficult to turn a profit. The rising salary cost of actors was a contributing factor, as studios vied to secure popular actors, such as Harrison Ford, Jim Carrey, Tom Cruise, and Arnold Schwarzenegger, who could generally guarantee a minimum level of box office success and held broad appeal outside of the United States (U.S.) and Canada. If notable stars were unavailable, studios were forced to pay exorbitant salaries for lesser stars and pay other cast lower salaries to offset the costs. The 1995 theatrical box office was in a downturn after the first quarter was about $90million lower than the same period in 1994. Markets outside of the U.S. and Canada were growing, accounting for 41% of a film's total revenue, including theatrical and home media profits, and outperforming the U.S. and Canadian box offices for the first time in 1994. Anticipated films such as Batman Forever, Crimson Tide, and Pocahontas, were scheduled for release alongside the most expensive film of its time, Waterworld, but New Line Cinema had low expectations for Seven, based on middling scores from test audiences.

Marketing
New Line Cinema's marketing president, Chris Pula, called the advertising campaign "risky" because it had to "prepare people" for Sevens violent and dark content while making it a topic of discussion among potential audiences. Early trailers and newspaper, television, and radio advertisements focused on the seven sins, presenting Seven as an "edgy" prestige film instead of a jumpscare-style horror. Entertainment professionals also believed violent or horrific films had a limited appeal and rarely received positive reviews. Fincher's public image had also been tarnished by the failure of Alien 3, and although Freeman and Pitt were proven stars capable of attracting audiences, New Line Cinema struggled to capitalize on Pitt's popularity. His core audience, teenage girls, were not the target audience for Seven, and research showed that young men would avoid taking a romantic partner to films featuring him because they felt "threatened" by his appeal. The positive word-of-mouth following Sevens theatrical release led the marketing campaign to shift focus toward targeting Pitt's female fans.

The premiere of Seven took place on September 19, 1995, at the Academy of Motion Picture Arts and Sciences in Beverly Hills, California. The event featured over 800 guests, including Fincher, Freeman, McGinley, Spacey, Tia Carrere, Elliott Gould, Matthew Modine, Lori Petty, Lou Diamond Phillips, Michael Rapaport, Eric Roberts, Robert Rodriguez, Steven Seagal, John Singleton, Christian Slater, Quentin Tarantino, and Jennifer Tilly.

Box office 
Seven was released in the United States and Canada on September 22, 1995. During its opening weekend, Seven earned $14million across 2,441 theaters—an average of $5,714 per theater—making it the number1 film of the weekend, ahead of the debut of Showgirls ($8.1million), and To Wong Foo, Thanks for Everything! Julie Newmar ($4.5million), in its third week of release. It became the highest-grossing opening September weekend of its time, replacing 1991's Freddy's Dead: The Final Nightmare ($12.6million). The successful opening was credited to the marketing campaign overcoming audience scepticism, as well as, in part, Pitt's popularity with males and females, although the opening audience skewed more male, as well as lack of competing action films. New Line Cinema distribution executive, Mitch Goldman, had moved up the release date of Seven to avoid this competition as well as strategically opening the film in more theaters than usual to target suburban and small-town locations where Pitt's recent films had fared well.

The film remained number1 in its second weekend, ahead of the debuts of Halloween: The Curse of Michael Myers ($7.3million) and Devil in a Blue Dress ($5.4million), and in its third weekend ahead of the debuting Assassins ($9.4million) and Dead Presidents ($8million). Seven remained the number1 film until its fifth weekend, falling to number3 behind the debuts of Get Shorty ($12.7million) and Now and Then ($7.4million), and was among the top ten-highest-grossing films for nine weeks. Seven had grossed about $87million by the end of December, when it received a wide re-release in select locations to raise the film's profile during the nomination period for the 1996 Academy Awards. The re-release helped raise Sevens box office to about $100.1million, making it the ninth-highest-grossing film of 1995, behind Casper ($100.3million), Jumanji ($100.5million), GoldenEye	($106.4million), Ace Ventura: When Nature Calls ($108.4million), Pocahontas	($141.6million), Apollo 13 ($173.8million), Batman Forever ($184million), and Toy Story ($192.5million). Estimates by industry experts suggest that as of 1997, the box office returns to the studio—minus the theaters' share—was $43.1million.

Seven also performed well outside of the U.S. and Canada, receiving positive audience reactions and successful debuts in countries such as Australia ($1.8million), South Korea ($808,009), Seoul ($961,538), New Zealand, and the Netherlands. Seven is estimated to have earned a further $227.2million, giving it a total worldwide gross of $327.3million, and making it the seventh-highest-grossing film worldwide, behind Apollo 13 ($335.8million), Batman Forever ($336.5million), Pocahontas ($347.1million), GoldenEye	($356.4million), Toy Story ($365.3million), and Die Hard: With a Vengeance ($366.1million). Seven was an unexpected success and became one of the most successful and most profitable films of 1995.

Reception

Critical response 
Critics such as Ebert and Howe described Seven as an intelligent and well-made film that could comfortably stand alongside other thrillers. Others compared Seven unfavorably with The Silence of the Lambs and The Usual Suspects, believing it lacked the same intelligent narrative, and took itself too seriously as an examination of evil instead of a "silly piece of pulp." The Orlando Sentinel said, however, that Seven did offer a "terrific film-noir atmosphere" and excellent performances, with The Seattle Times saying that the film would be "unendurable" without Freeman and Spacey.

Critics unanimously praised Freeman's performance. Terrence Rafferty and Kenneth Turan wrote that Freeman's "exceptional" performance was mainly responsible for making Seven watchable in spite of itself. Desson Howe and James Berardinelli said the performance elevated Pitt's own to appear "actorly," although Freeman often stole every scene in which he appeared, providing a fresh take on an otherwise cliché role. Reviews of Pitt's performance were polarized between those who found it "energetic" and impressive, and those who believed the role was beyond his acting abilities. Some reviewers found his performance to continue his successful transition to more serious roles from those based mainly on his appearance, although Howe said Pitt's presence did more for Seven than his acting. The Orlando Sentinel said what could have been a cliché role was saved by Mills not being inept or inexperienced, just out of his depth on this particular case. Some reviews said that the character was underdeveloped, pointless, stupid, and not particularly likeable, and that Pitt's performance lacked the subtlety or effectiveness to compensate. Critics positively received Paltrow's performance, believing she made the most of her limited screentime and was generally underutilized, while considering the character a "flimsy contrivance". Spacey's performance was also praised for its creepy and understated portrayal of an intelligent character who does not undermine themselves with "a moment of sheer stupidity."

Fincher's directorial style was praised for its "striking craftmanship", and "stunning" visuals that often thrilled and exasperated the viewer simultaneously. In contrast, Rafferty said that his style was less effective stretched over the film's runtime and that Fincher mistook darkness for profundity and chose style over coherence. Although Siskel considered Walker's script to be smartly written, several critics were less enthusiastic, finding the dialogue trite, many scenes implausible, and character motivations weak. Jami Bernard and Richard Schickel wrote that Seven lacked many of the essentials prevalent of its genre such as suspense, witty dialogue, and cathartic humor, or the psychological depth to match the intellectual thrills of its peer, The Silence of the Lambs.

The violent content of Seven was generally negatively received. Critics such as Berardinelli and Gene Siskel found the gore excessive and "gratuitous". While some found the violent visuals to be tiresome and detracting, others believed that Fincher skilfully avoided showing the violence that led to the deaths, preventing them from distracting from Sevens more enjoyable aspects. Even so, Ebert and Turan believed Seven would be too disturbing for many viewers. Fincher responded, "I didn't set out to piss off the people who are upset. I was told that Michael Medved [film critic at the New York Post] wrote that the movie was evil, but I'm sure he slows down when he passes an accident just like everyone else. Death fascinates people, but they don't deal with it." Howe and Owen Gleiberman felt the ending was "like an act of treachery against the viewer," undermining any hope for a positive outcome, and Barry Norman said it denied the audience "even of the final comfort they fully deserve." Roger Ebert, however, found the ending to be "satisfying," but underwhelming compared to the film's earlier events. Audiences polled by CinemaScore gave the film an average grade of "B" on a scale of A+ to F.

Accolades 
Seven received one nomination at the 68th Academy Awards for Best Editing (Richard Francis-Bruce), and Walker was nominated for Best Original Screenplay at the 49th British Academy Film Awards. At the MTV Movie Awards, Seven received three awards, Best Movie, Most Desirable Male (Pitt), and Best Villain (Spacey).

Thematic analysis

Apathy and hope
The apathy of the unnamed city's inhabitants is a central theme in Seven. Somerset does not believe the city can be saved, intending to retire outside of its confines, and telling Mills that women are taught to yell "fire," not "help," because people are more likely to pay attention if they selfishly think themselves in danger. Taubin described the city as an infection point for corruption, where signs of violence and decay are omnipresent in its dark corners and rain, as well as the television reports, fights, screams, and children in impoverished apartments. Dyer compared the near ubiquitous rain to films such as Blade Runner (1982), as a constant, near inescapable presence, which in Seven can represent sin seeping into every gap. The bleak aesthetic of the city implies a layer of moral decay and indifference by its inhabitants, that enables Doe's plan. Somerset has not stopped caring, but he has become as apathetic as those around him because of the futility of his efforts. Seven reinforces this in several scenes, such as when his concerns that a child witnessed a murder are dismissed, the police captain's indifference to a mugger needlessly stabbing out his victim's eyes, and the sex club manager who dislikes his role but sees no alternative. Even so, Somerset tries to spare Tracy from the influence of the city by advising her to leave with her unborn child.

Somerset and Doe both perceive the ubiquity of sin and indifference toward it. There are parallels in how both men live alone, are devoted to their work, and do not have any meaningful relationships. Although there is mention of Somerset's former partner and some degree of respect with his colleagues, he tells Tracy that "anyone who spends a significant amount of time with me finds me disagreeable." Doe's apartment is a reflection of his own isolation from society. They differ, however, in their response to sin: Somerset has surrendered to apathy and sorrow, while Doe feels contempt for society and has assumed a role as their punisher. It is implied that Somerset was once passionate about his work until he realized he could not change things, while Doe is dedicated and passionate, believing wholeheartedly in the change his work will bring. Somerset has never killed anyone, and retains a spark of hope that humanity can be better, while Doe kills freely, believing humanity is beyond saving. When Mills tells Doe he is killing innocent people, Doe replies, "only in a world this shitty could you even try to say these were innocent people and keep a straight face. But that's the point. We see a deadly sin on every street corner, in every home, and we tolerate it. We tolerate it because it's common, it's trivial. We tolerate it morning, noon, and night. Well, not anymore."

Mills and Somerset are contrasting characters in terms of temperament, morality, intelligence, and personal connections. Somerset is analytical, wise, experienced, and meticulous, while Mills is young, messy, and inexperienced, but full of potential. Mills is optimistic and relatively light-hearted, choosing to move to the city because he believed he could have a positive influence until everything is taken from him. Goldberg wrote that Mills and Tracy are naive to the city's corruption, demonstrated by how they are tricked into renting an apartment that experiences constant shaking from nearby trains. Dyer said Tracy, in particular, represents potential virtue, but as she is used infrequently to conceal her eventual fate, her impact is reduced.

Doe's plan does work, shocking Somerset out of his apathy and inspiring him to defer his retirement and fight for a better future. Walker said of the ending, "it's about "optimist Mills"... going up against this pessimistic kind of world-weary detective in Somerset... those dramatically opposed points of view are pushing and pulling each other throughout the story. And then once pessimism is confirmed, even to the optimist who's been arguing that the fight is always worth fighting, will the pessimist in the light of confirmation of all his worst predictions, will he stay or will he walk away?" Rosenbaum described it as a "touching, old-fashioned faith in the power of good to reassert itself," tempered by the fact the hope is inspired by a self-martyred serial killer. He criticized that Seven chose style over substance, giving the overall message that we "remain exactly where we are." Dyer compared Doe to Hannibal Lecter in The Silence of the Lambs, in terms of ability to outthink and manipulate the authorities combined with his artistic method of arranging his murders, but that they are contrasted by their different social statuses, Lecter being an educated professional and a preference for luxury, while Doe is seemingly self taught, unemployed, and obsessed only with his mission. However, Rosenbaum said that unlike The Silence of the Lambs, Seven did not "exploit its psycho killer for cheap laughs or blind hero worship." Nayman found Seven problematic, believing it did venerate Doe as having a valid criticism of society.

Religion and order
Doe's murders are described by Somerset as his sermons to the masses. Dyer and Saunders describe Doe as conducting a violent crusade demonstrating the consequences of moral decay and sinning, based on his own interpretation of Christian ideology, in a city compared to the biblical Sodom and Gomorrah. Writer Patricia Moir said that theorists in the late 1990s believed a growing trend in North America resulted in the decay of social meta narratives of order created by religion, science and art, in turn diminishing societal norms, and that in absence of these paradigms, all that remained was the chaos of existence. Somerset tries to create order using the ticking of a metronome to disguise the disordered noise of sirens and screams outside his apartment. Dyer wrote that Somerset smashing the metronome is him acknowledging he can no longer ignore the darkness of the city. Doe creates order by filtering literature about the seven deadly sins and works by authors such as John Milton through a lense of religious fanatacism. He believes his purpose is given by God, which is reflected in the opening credits depicting Doe cutting the word "God" from a dollar bill; Kyle Cooper said, "I hesitated on that one but decided to do it because John Doe took it on himself to play God." 

Doe rationalizes that everyone is guilty of sin or wishing ill on other sinners. According to Dyer, Doe is conscious he is also a sinner and so his plan involves his own death. Goldberg wrote that Doe is the true sin of wrath, evidenced by his violent acts, but to complete his plan he must make Mills "become" wrath, and gives himself the sin of "envy". His resigned acceptance of the sin is, according to Goldberg, because there is no other sin for him to take and he is conscious that sins will not end with his death. Doe transferring wrath to Mills also demonstrates the infectiousness and pervasiveness of sin. When Mills kills Doe it can be considered an act of good and justice, eliminating a remorseless force of evil, but he commits the act purely for revenge. Film professor Richard Dyer suggests that Doe did not know how to conclude his plan until meeting with Mills while disguised as a photographer, during which Mills displays his wrath. Writer Shaina Weatherhead believed Seven foreshadows the importance of the wrath and envy sins throughout, identifying the color red as representing wrath and green representing envy, colors which appear often: Somerset has a red lamp, Mills drinks from a green mug, and there are background green buildings with red address numbering.

Seven features subtle references to the number seven, reinforcing the religious subtext, such as the Doe's plan culminating on Sunday, the seventh day of the week and the biblical day of rest, on which Doe's package for Mills is delivered at 7:01pm. In researching Doe, Somerset references material including "The Parson's Tale" by Geoffrey Chaucer, which discusses penance, Dante Alighieri's Divine Comedy and its seven terraces of purgatory, a Catholic dictionary, and a reference to seven children being slain. There are also references to art in Seven such as a stack of spaghetti cans resembling Campbell's Soup Cans by Andy Warhol. Journalist Kim Newman considered each of Doe's kills to be arranged as an artistic piece dedicated to each sin. Commentary appears on the excesses of performance art and culture of celebrity, with Mills referring to Doe as a "movie of the week" and a "fucking T-Shirt", implying his legacy will be brief before fading into obscurity. Moir said that Seven provides no final answers about Doe's legacy, but implies that things have potentially only gotten worse.

Post release

Home media 
Seven was released on VHS, DVD, and Laserdisc in 1996. A 2-disc special edition DVD released in 2000, introduced additional features including a remastered picture scanned from the original film negative, extended or deleted scenes, the original opening with Somerset and cut-to-black ending, production photos and designs, and storyboards for an alternate ending. The release also included four commentary tracks: Pitt, Fincher, and Freeman discussing Seven; a discussion between Fincher, De Luca, Francis-Bruce, Walker, and film studies professor Richard Dyer; Khondji, Max, Dyer, Francis-Bruce, and Fincher; and an isolated music and effects score with commentary by Shore, Klyce, Dyer, and Fincher. The film was released on Blu-ray Disc in 2010, featuring remastered visuals and containing all of the additional content present in the special edition, with an additional collectible DigiBook version containing production notes and photo stills.

The Seven soundtrack was released with the film in November 1995. The 11-track compact disc and cassette tape release contained several of the songs used in the film, such as "Guilty" and "In the Beginning", as well as two pieces of the score ("Portrait of John Doe" and "Suite from Seven"), but omitted "Closer" and "The Hearts Filthy Lesson". A bootleg recording of the score was released in the late 1990s, before an official debut of the full 16-piece score in 2016.

Other media
A novelization of Seven, written by Anthony Bruno, was released alongside the film in November 1995. A seven-issue comic book series, Seven, was released between September 2006 and October 2007 by Zenescope Entertainment. Serving as a prequel to the events of the film, the comic book focuses on Doe and the planning of his crimes.

Legacy

Critical reassessment
Seven is now regarded as one of the best thriller, crime, and mystery films ever made. Some publications have listed Seven among the greatest films of all time. A 2014 poll of 2,120 entertainment industry professionals by The Hollywood Reporter ranked Seven as the eighty-fifth-best film of all time. The website's critical consensus says: "A brutal, relentlessly grimy shocker with taut performances, slick gore effects, and a haunting finale." The film has a score of 65 out of 100 on Metacritic based on 22 critics' reviews, indicating "generally favorable reviews".

Retrospectives have identified Seven as retaining its appeal over its peers due to its bleak, often imitated but rarely equalled ending, as well as Fincher's story-focused directorial style. Critic Matt Goldberg described Seven as timeless because of its stylized reality that is not linked to any particular time or place, and lack of popular culture references, advertisements, or focus on technology. Discussing Sevens lasting positive legacy as a thriller, Walker said: "I know a lot of people hate Seven and think it's just garbage, so it's good to be humbled in that way. I'm really proud of it... Looking back at the time that's passed, I feel extremely lucky that they never managed to make a sequel to it... I've been lucky that they've not managed to make a prequel to it, which, in my opinion, sucks all of the kind of meaning and energy out of who and what John Doe represents. I love that it's still a standalone piece. Seven is included in the 2013 film reference book 1001 Movies You Must See Before You Die, and has been listed among Pitt's and Fincher's best films.

Cultural influence
Seven helped Pitt's transition into more serious and dramatic acting roles. He and Paltrow became romantically involved before the film's release, and Pitt would work again with Fincher on films such as Fight Club (1999). It also established Freeman as a mentor-type figure, an archetype he would reprise in many projects thereafter. After the failure of Alien 3, Seven revitalized Fincher's feature film career, establishing him among the most iconoclastic Hollywood directors of his generation; he would direct The Game (1997), Fight Club, and Panic Room (2002) over the next few years. Walker and Shore collaborated with Fincher on several other projects. Describing the personal impact on himself, Walker said "ten years down the line, if nothing else got produced. I'd still have this great movie on video... when I'm run out of town, living my old age, running a miniature golf shop, I can always have what I've dreamt of having since I was very young." In a 2022 interview, MacKay (Sloth) said that he was still earning "healthy residual payments" for his role, and would occasionally be recognized in public by fans. He said: "people still think they used a dummy in that scene... I get that a lot. But that was me."

Seven inspired many filmmakers, and is considered influential on crime-based films and television shows that replicated its grim aesthetic, body horror imagery, lighting, and premise of disenchanted detectives pursuing criminals with distinct killing methods and motivations, featured in Kiss the Girls (1997), The Bone Collector (1999), Along Came a Spider, The Pledge (both 2001), the Saw series (2003), and television series Prodigal Son (2019–2021). Collider said Seven caused a resurgence in faith-based horror, supernatural, and apocalyptic mystery films. The superhero film, The Batman (2022), shares similar style and tone with Seven, and publications such as Rolling Stone called it "part superhero blockbuster, part 1970s-antihero homage, and part Seven remake." Sevens use of alternative music by Nine Inch Nails is also seen as contributing to more mainstream use of similar songs in films such as Final Destination (2000), Lara Croft: Tomb Raider (2001), and Resident Evil (2002).

The title credit sequence for Seven was called "one of the most important design innovations of the 1990s" by the New York Times. Art of the Title described it as the beginning of a "renaissance in title design, particularly in the horror genre, and its influence was evident over two decades after Sevens release. In 2011, IFC ranked the sequence as the third best ever made, behind those of Vertigo (1958) and A Hard Day's Night (1964), and its style can be seen in the opening credits of films such as The Bone Collector, Red Dragon, and Taking Lives (2004).

The film's twist ending is considered one of the best in cinematic history. Pitt's dialogue, "What's in the box?", as he asks Somerset to confirm the contents of Doe's box, has become iconic, used in popular culture and memes. Walker said "[The twist is] one of the reasons I think Seven did well... because people went in and they did not know in the first ten minutes exactly how the movie was going to end." Although it is only implied that Tracy's head is in the box, Fincher recalled an encounter with a woman who said, "'There is no need to make a stand in of Gwyneth Paltrow's head to find in the box. You don't need to see that.' And I said, 'Well, we didn't.' And she said, 'Oh yes, you did.' So, the imagination, if properly primed, can do more than any army of makeup artists." John Doe has been named by several publications as one of the great cinematic villains.

Sequel

A sequel, Ei8ht, was proposed by New Line Cinema in 2002, based on a repurposed spec script titled Solace by Ted Griffin about a psychic serial killer pursued by a similarly psychic detective, Somerset. The idea was eventually abandoned after principal Seven cast and crew, including Freeman and Pitt, expressed no intention to return for a sequel and Fincher said "I would be less interested in that than I would in having cigarettes put out in my eyes." The script was made into the standalone thriller, Solace (2015), which was a critical and commercial failure.

References

Notes

Citations

Works cited

External links 
 
 
 
 
 
 

1995 films
1995 drama films
1995 crime drama films
1995 crime thriller films
1995 independent films
1990s chase films
1990s English-language films
1990s police films
1990s serial killer films
1990s thriller drama films
American chase films
American crime drama films
American crime thriller films
American independent films
American neo-noir films
American police detective films
American serial killer films
American thriller drama films
Films about murder
Films about religion
Films directed by David Fincher
Films produced by Arnold Kopelson
Films scored by Howard Shore
Films shot in California
Films with screenplays by Andrew Kevin Walker
New Line Cinema films
Seven deadly sins in popular culture
1990s American films